Uwe Jahn (born 4 April 1971) is a former German sprinter who specialised in the 400 metres.

A four-time German Athletics Champion, Jahn's team was disqualified from the 1995 World Championships in Athletics – Men's 4 × 400 metres relay final. The following year, he was only a stand-by athlete for Germany at the 1996 Summer Olympics.

Achievements

References 
 

1971 births
Living people
German male sprinters
German national athletics champions
World Athletics Championships athletes for Germany